Jafarova Sevda Shirin gizi (born 27 March 1965) is an Azerbaijani pediatrician, reanimatologist, and neonatologist. She is Doctor of Philosophy in medical sciences holder, Regional Medical Coordinator of the United Nations (UN) on Azerbaijan, member of the Commission of the Ministry of Health of the Republic of Azerbaijan on the Study of Childhood and Adolescent Development and Death, medical director of Reference Group Leyla Medical Center and member of the board of directors.

Personal life 
Jafarova Sevda Shirin gizi was born on March 27, 1965, in Baku. She is married and has three children and a grandchild.

Education 
She graduated from Mikhail Mushfiq school with a gold medal in 1982. In 1988, she graduated with a diploma of honors from the Faculty of Pediatrics of Azerbaijan Medical University.

Later in 1988, se joined Perinatology Institute of the Russian Academy of Sciences, Faculty of Neonatology, and Clinical Internship until 1990.

In 1997, she graduated with Phd. in Scientific Research Institute of Pediatrics named after K.Y.Farajova.

Career 
She started her career as an operational nurse in 1985 at Baku Emergency Medical Hospital . In 1988, she moved to Russia and worked as a clinical intern at Central Perinatology Institute. Sevda Jafarova returned to Azerbaijan in 1990 when she was appointed as a child and adolescent health inspector at the Baku Main Health Department. 

In 1992, she worked at the Republican Children's Clinical Hospital as a reanimatologist. Until 1999, she worked as a reanimatologist and senior researcher in the Newborn Reanimatology Department of the institute.

In 1998, worked as a pediatrician in the MediClub Emergency Medical Service. At the time, she was the head of the Department of Neonatology at the Private Leyla Shikhlinskaya Clinical Obstetrics and Gynecology Clinic.

In 2017, she was appointed Director-General of MediClub Emergency Medical Services. In 2018, she started to work as the senior advisor to the Corporative Division of the Republican Medical Diagnostic Center. And since March 2019, she is a medical director of Leyla Medical Center and a member of the board of directors.

Participations 
She participated in the III International Congress of Pediatricians of Central Asia and Turkey, held in Almaty, Kazakhstan, in 1996;  the International Congress of Pediatricians in Tehran, at the IV Regional Congress of Pediatric Societies of Turkic-speaking Countries, 1997;   the course "Advanced Life Support for Children" in Salzburg,  Austria in 2000; the IX Congress of Pediatricians in Moscow, in 2001;  the training course "Neuro-psychiatric problems in early childhood" in Haifa, Israel; and others.

Awards 
In 2016, she was awarded the badge "Excellent Health" by the Ministry of Healthcare (Azerbaijan).

In 2017, she was awarded the honorary diploma for her participation in the Special American Business Internship Training (SABIT) program of the International Trade Administration.

International trainer 
Since 2010, Sevda Jafarova has served as a trainer at international events.

From 2010 to 2012 she worked as a trainer in the MIMMS Natural Disaster Management System in Edinburgh, United Kingdom, at the 31st ESPID Symposium in Milan, in 2013, "EBRD, Leadership and Action, Finance and Advice for Women in Business,  2016 in and SABIT Hospital Management Practices Program in the United States, in 2017 “Public Health Organization and Management” in London, 2015–2018, and Master of Science in Health Management, since 2018, York st. John University (UK) and John Kennedy College (Switzerland).

Science articles 
Jafarova S.Sh. State of osmoregulation in newborns with intracraneal hemorrhage. Abstractive book Third regional congress of pediatrics of central Asia and Turkey with international participation Almaty, September 23–27, 1996, page 186.
Jafarova S.Sh. Osmolarity discrimination as a standard for severe conditions of newborns in the intercranial hemorrhage (international congress of pediatrics) 12–17 October 1996, page 842, Tegeran.
Jafarova S.Sh. Disorders osmohomeostasis in the intercranial hemorrhage in newborns and method of its infusion correction (abstract book 4 regional congress of pediatric of Turkish speaking countries with international participation,  September 21–25, 1997 Baku, page 122.
Jafarova S.Sh. Osmoregulating function of the kidneys in newborns with intercranial hemorrhage, (abstract book 4 regional congress of pediatric of Turkish speaking countries with international participation), September 21–25, page 129.
Jafarova S.Sh. Disorders of state of osmohomeostasis in premature newborns. Azerbaijan Medical journal, 1997 N 4, page 32–35.
Jafarova S.Sh. Optimization of infusion therapy in newborns with intracranial hemorrhage. Abstract book science conference of pediatrics. Azerbaijan Republic. Page 30–32.
Jafarova S.Sh. Ultrasound methods kidneys investigations in newborns. Abstract book science conference of pediatrics. Azerbaijan republic. Page 32–35.
Jafarova S.Sh. Combination of clinical osmometric and neyrosonographic values as severity of pereventricular hemorrhage in newborns, Azerbaijan Medical Journal, 1997, N 5, page 32–35.

References 

1965 births
Living people
Azerbaijan Medical University alumni
Azerbaijani physicians
Azerbaijani women physicians
Physicians from Baku
Azerbaijani pediatricians
20th-century Azerbaijani women
21st-century Azerbaijani women